The following is a list of notable deaths in September 2021.

Entries for each day are listed alphabetically by surname. A typical entry lists information in the following sequence:
 Name, age, country of citizenship at birth, subsequent country of citizenship (if applicable), reason for notability, cause of death (if known), and reference.

September 2021

1
Assyr Abdulle, 50, Swiss mathematician.
Janet Adam, 81, Scottish potter and sculptor.
Adalberto Álvarez, 72, Cuban pianist (Son 14), COVID-19.
Jean-Denis Bredin, 92, French attorney, founder of Bredin Prat and member of the Académie Française.
Anna Cataldi, 81, Italian journalist and humanitarian.
Paul Chillan, 85, French footballer (US Robert, Nîmes, Arles).
Daffney, 46, American professional wrestler (WCW, SHINE, TNA), suicide by gunshot.
Noel Dellow, 92, New Zealand cricketer (Canterbury).
Carol Fran, 87, American soul blues singer, pianist, and songwriter, complications from COVID-19.
Jim Fuller, 76, American football player and coach (Alabama Crimson Tide, Jacksonville State Gamecocks), complications from COVID-19.
Syed Ali Shah Geelani, 91, Indian Kashmiri separatist leader, Jammu and Kashmir MLA (1972–1982, 1987–1990).
Alison Gray, 78, New Zealand writer and social researcher, motor neuron disease.
Doug Green, 66, American politician, member of the Ohio House of Representatives (2013–2020), COVID-19.
José Gonçalves Heleno, 93, Brazilian Roman Catholic prelate, coadjutor bishop (1976–1977) and bishop of Governador Valadares (1977–2001).
Waldo Holmes, 92, American trumpeter and songwriter (Rock the Boat).
Norbert Klein, 65, Dutch politician, MP (2012–2017).
Catherine MacPhail, 75, Scottish author (Roxy's Baby).
George Martin, 83, Spanish actor (Kiss Kiss...Bang Bang, Clint the Stranger, The Return of Clint the Stranger).
David Moursund, 84, American mathematician and computer scientist.
Norberto Mario Oyarbide, 70, Argentine judge, justice of the Supreme Court (1994–2016), COVID-19.
Allison Payne, 57, American news anchor (WGN-TV).
Juan Rodríguez Vega, 77, Chilean footballer (Unión Española, Atlético Español, national team).
Leopoldo Serantes, 59, Filipino boxer, Olympic bronze medallist (1988), COPD.
Margaret Stone, Australian judge, inspector-general of intelligence and security (2015–2020).
Dan Swecker, 74, American politician, member of the Washington State Senate (1995–2013), complications from COVID-19.
Carlos Thorne, 98, Peruvian novelist and lawyer.
Sid Watson, 93, English footballer (Mansfield Town, Ilkeston Town).
Kurt Zwikl, 72, American politician, member of the Pennsylvania House of Representatives (1973–1984).

2
Hans Antonsson, 86, Swedish wrestler, Olympic bronze medallist (1960).
Efren Arroyo, 68, Puerto Rican journalist (WAPA-TV, WKAQ-TV, WKAQ-AM), COVID-19.
Michel Corboz, 87, Swiss conductor.
Manuel Soares Costa, 88, Portuguese politician, minister of agriculture (1983–1984).
Daniele Del Giudice, 72, Italian author and lecturer, complications from Alzheimer's disease.
Alemayehu Eshete, 80, Ethiopian singer.
Ruth Bradley Holmes, 96, American Cherokee language linguist and educator.
Vladimír Hubáček, 89, Czech rally driver.
Aydin Ibrahimov, 82, Azerbaijani wrestler, Olympic bronze medallist (1964), COVID-19.
Gurbanmuhammet Kasymow, 67, Turkmen politician and lawyer, minister of internal affairs (1993–1998), defense (1998–1999), and justice (1999–2001), COVID-19.
Bobby Lackey, 83, American football player (Texas Longhorns).
Steve Lawler, 56, American professional wrestler and trainer, COVID-19.
Mad Clip, 34, Greek rapper, traffic collision.
Keith McCants, 53, American football player (Alabama Crimson Tide, Tampa Bay Buccaneers, Houston Oilers).
Josephine Medina, 51, Filipino table tennis player, Paralympic bronze medallist (2016).
Ataullah Mengal, 92, Pakistani politician, chief minister of Balochistan (1972–1973), heart attack.
Chandan Mitra, 65, Indian journalist (The Pioneer) and politician, MP (2003–2016).
Isabel da Nóbrega, 96, Portuguese writer.
David Patten, 47, American football player (New York Giants, New England Patriots, Washington Redskins), traffic collision.
Stanley Rachman, 87, Canadian psychologist.
Ryan Sakoda, 48, Japanese-American professional wrestler (EWF, WWE).
Sidharth Shukla, 40, Indian actor (Broken But Beautiful, Balika Vadhu, Dil Se Dil Tak) and reality show contestant, heart attack.
Hashibur Rahman Swapon, 67, Bangladeshi politician, MP (1996–1998, since 2014), COVID-19.
Mikis Theodorakis, 96, Greek composer ("Mauthausen Trilogy", Zorba the Greek, Z), MP (1981–1993).
Frederick L. Van Sickle, 78, American jurist, judge (since 1991) and chief judge (2000–2005) of the U.S. District Court for Eastern Washington.
Frankie Welch, 97, American fashion designer, dementia.
John M. Williams, 85, American college football coach (Mississippi College).
Anne Wingate, 77, American author.

3
Muhammad Saeed al-Hakim, 85, Iraqi marja', heart attack.
Beryl Atkins, 90, British lexicographer.
Ljubo Bešlić, 63, Bosnian politician, mayor of Mostar (2004–2021).
David Borwein, 97, Canadian mathematician.
Raghunath Chandorkar, 100, Indian cricketer (Maharashtra).
Marian Collier, 90, American actress (Mr. Novak, Lethal Weapon).
Janet Doub Erickson, 97, American graphic artist and writer.
Hassan Firouzabadi, 70, Iranian military officer, chief of staff of the Armed Forces (1989–2016), COVID-19.
Barbara Inkpen, 71, British Olympic high jumper (1968, 1972).
Philip Jamison, 96, American watercolorist.
Juan Kahnert, 93, Argentine Olympic shot putter (1948).
Irma Kalish, 96, American television writer and producer (Good Times, The Facts of Life, Family Affair), complications from pneumonia.
Yolanda López, 78, American painter, printmaker, and film producer, cancer.
Sérgio Mamberti, 82, Brazilian actor (O Baiano Fantasma, The Lady from the Shanghai Cinema, Castelo Rá-Tim-Bum), multiple organ failure.
Attilio Maseri, 85, Italian cardiologist.
Bernadetta Matuszczak, 84, Polish composer.
Enrique Molina, 77, Cuban actor (The Man from Maisinicu, Hello Hemingway, Video de Familia), COVID-19.
Ruth Olay, 97, American jazz singer.
Ahamed Samsudeen, 32, Sri Lankan terrorist (2021 Auckland supermarket stabbing), shot.
Shinichiro Sawai, 83, Japanese film director (W's Tragedy, Early Spring Story, Bloom in the Moonlight), multiple organ failure.
Nestor Soriano, 67, Filipino Olympic sailor (1988), COVID-19.
Henriette Valium, 62, Canadian comic book artist and painter.
Andrew Walker, 67, Scottish murderer, respiratory infection.
John Watkins, 98, South African cricketer (Natal, national team), COVID-19.
Robert C. Wetenhall, 86, American executive of Canadian football, owner of the Montreal Alouettes (1997–2018).
Betty Wood, 76, British historian and academic, cancer.

4
Billy Cafaro, 84, Argentine singer.
Bohumil Cepák, 70, Czech Olympic handball player (1976).
Paula Clayton, 86, American psychiatrist.
Gerhard Erber, 86, German classical pianist.
Dell Furano, 70, American music industry executive and entrepreneur, CEO of Live Nation Entertainment (2008–2012).
Rune Gerhardsen, 75, Norwegian politician and sports executive, mayor of Oslo (1992–1997), leader of the AUF (1973–1975), and three-time chairman of the NSF.
Albert Giger, 74, Swiss cross country skier, Olympic bronze medalist (1972), cancer.
Léonard Groguhet, 82, Ivorian actor (Ma Famille) and comedian.
Bernard Holdridge, 86, British Anglican priest, archdeacon of Doncaster (1994–2001).
Derek Hole, 87, British Anglican priest, provost of Leicester Cathedral (1992–1999).
Tunch Ilkin, 63, Turkish-born American football player (Pittsburgh Steelers) and broadcaster, complications from amyotrophic lateral sclerosis.
Christian Lenglolo, 39, Cameroonian footballer (Persipura Jayapura, Persikota Tangerang, Sriwijaya), heart attack.
David Pallister, 76, British investigative journalist (The Guardian, Exaro).
Mort Ransen, 88, Canadian film director (Margaret's Museum) and screenwriter, dementia.
Nicole Saeys, 97, Belgian Olympic javelin thrower (1948).
Jörg Schlaich, 86, German structural engineer.
Willard Scott, 87, American weatherman (WRC-TV, Today), creator of Ronald McDonald.
Martin Thompson, 65, New Zealand artist.
Greta Tomlinson, 94, English artist.
Alberto Vilar, 80, American investment manager, arts patron and convicted fraudster.
Lydia Wevers, 71, Dutch-born New Zealand literary critic, editor and historian.

5
Carmen Balthrop, 73, American operatic soprano.
Eugene N. Borza, 86, American historian.
Ion Caramitru, 79, Romanian actor (Citizen X, Adam & Paul, Charlie Countryman) and politician, minister of culture (1996–2000).
Chung Jen-pi, 88–89, Chinese potehi puppeteer.
Ezio Della Savia, 79, Italian Olympic swimmer (1960, 1964).
Keshav Desiraju, 66, Indian bureaucrat and mental health advocate, cardiac arrest.
Christian Dutoit, 80, French journalist.
Sándor Egeresi, 57, Serbian politician, president of the Assembly of Vojvodina (2008–2012).
Mohammad Fahim Dashty, 48, Afghan journalist, politician and military officer, spokesperson of the National Resistance Front of Afghanistan, shot.
Marcel Garrouste, 100, French politician, mayor of Penne-d'Agenais (1971–1983) and deputy (1976–1986, 1988–1993).
Sarah Harding, 39, English singer (Girls Aloud) and actress (Run for Your Wife, St Trinian's 2: The Legend of Fritton's Gold), breast cancer.
Jan Hecker, 54, German lawyer and diplomat, judge of the Federal Administrative Court (2011–2015) and ambassador to China (since 2021).
Robert P. Hollenbeck, 89, American politician, member of the New Jersey General Assembly (1974–1986).
Ralph Irizarry, 67, American percussionist and bandleader, multiple organ failure.
Susana Lanteri, 86, Argentine actress (Argentino hasta la muerte, Los golpes bajos).
Jonah Lwanga, 76, Ugandan Orthodox prelate, metropolitan of Kampala and all Uganda (since 1997).
Matej Marin, 41, Slovenian racing cyclist.
Jonathan Mirsky, 88, American journalist and historian.
Donncha Ó Dúlaing, 88, Irish broadcaster (RTÉ Radio).
Ivan Patzaichin, 71, Romanian sprint canoeist and coach, four-time Olympic champion, lung cancer.
Živko Radišić, 84, Bosnian politician, chairman of the Presidency (1998–1999, 2000–2001) and mayor of Banja Luka (1977–1982).
João Sayad, 75, Brazilian economist, blood cancer.
Tony Selby, 83, English actor (Get Some In!, Doctor Who, Witchfinder General), COVID-19.
Nell Sjöström, 88, Swedish Olympic sprinter (1952).
Viv Stephens, 67, New Zealand cricket player (Wellington, Central Districts, national team) and administrator.
John A. Terry, 88, American jurist, judge of the District of Columbia Court of Appeals (1982–2016), heart failure.

6
Jean-Pierre Adams, 73, French footballer (Nîmes, Nice, national team).
Billy Apple, 85, New Zealand painter and sculptor.
Peter Arnold, 94, New Zealand cricketer (Northamptonshire, Canterbury).
Claude Azéma, 78, French Roman Catholic prelate, auxiliary bishop of Montpellier (2003–2018).
Adam Baumann, 73, Polish actor (Śmierć jak kromka chleba, Wojaczek, Destined for Blues).
Jean-Paul Belmondo, 88, French actor (Breathless, That Man from Rio, Pierrot le Fou), César winner (1989).
Peter Bentley, 91, Austrian-born Canadian businessman.
Nino Castelnuovo, 84, Italian actor (Rocco and His Brothers, The Umbrellas of Cherbourg, The Five Man Army).
Thierry Choffat, 53, French political scientist.
Cockie van der Elst, 93, Dutch Olympic speed skater (1952).
Yolanda Fernández de Cofiño, 86, Guatemalan businesswoman and philanthropist.
Jennifer Fiori, 35, Italian racing cyclist, traffic collision.
Enrique González Pedrero, 91, Mexican politician, senator (1970–1976) and governor of Tabasco (1982–1987).
Derek Goodrich, 94, British Anglican clergyman, dean of St. George's Cathedral, Georgetown (1984–1993).
Anthony Johnson, 55, American actor (House Party, Friday, Menace II Society) and comedian.
Zanele kaMagwaza-Msibi, 59, South African politician, MP (2014–2019), cardiac arrest from COVID-19.
Tomasz Knapik, 77, Polish film, radio, and television reader.
Eberhard Kulenkampff, 93, German-Namibian architect and city planner.
Dick Parfitt, 90, American college basketball coach (Central Michigan Chippewas).
Pedrés, 89, Spanish bullfighter.
Sunil Perera, 68, Sri Lankan vocalist (The Gypsies), complications from COVID-19.
Frank Russell, 72, American basketball player (Detroit Titans, Chicago Bulls), complications from COVID-19.
Todd Scully, 72, American Olympic racewalker (1976), traffic collision.
Hadj Smaine Mohamed Seghir, 88, Algerian actor (The Battle of Algiers, The Winds of the Aures, Chronicle of the Years of Fire).
Alec Smith, 91, British trade unionist, president of the Trades Union Congress (1991). (death announced on this date)
Adlai Stevenson III, 90, American politician, senator (1970–1981), member of the Illinois House of Representatives (1965–1967), and Illinois Treasurer (1967–1970), complications from dementia.
Anthony Ukpo, 74, Nigerian politician, military governor of Rivers State (1986–1988).
Károly Vass, 77, Hungarian Olympic handballer (1972, 1976).
Iván Vitányi, 96, Hungarian philosopher and politician, MP (1990–2014).
Michael K. Williams, 54, American actor (The Wire, Boardwalk Empire, 12 Years a Slave), accidental drug overdose.
Severian Yakymyshyn, 91, Canadian Ukrainian Greek Catholic hierarch, bishop of New Westminster (1995–2007).
Donald Zec, 102, British journalist (Daily Mirror).
Sabina Zimering, 98, Polish-American ophthalmologist and memoirist.

7
Noubir Amaoui, 85, Moroccan trade unionist.
Rick Arrington, 74, American football player (Philadelphia Eagles).
Edward Barnes, 92, British television executive and producer, co-creator of Blue Peter.
Carl Bean, 77, American Protestant church leader, singer ("I Was Born This Way") and LGBT rights activist.
Terry Brennan, 93, American college football player and coach (Notre Dame).
Jahangir Butt, 78, Pakistani field hockey player, Olympic champion (1968).
Elizabeth A. Clark, 82, American patrologist.
Sam Cunningham, 71, American football player (New England Patriots).
Sir John Herbecq, 99, British civil servant.
Alan Hofmann, 90, American physiologist and biochemist.
Amanda Holden, 73, British musician, librettist (Bliss) and translator.
Daikichi Irokawa, 96, Japanese historian.
Issei Kitagawa, 78, Japanese politician, member of the House of Councillors (2004–2016), prostate cancer.
Jay Leiderman, 50, American lawyer, heart attack.
Steve Pugh, 60, American politician, member of the Louisiana House of Representatives (2008–2020).
Martha Patricia Ramírez Lucero, 69, Mexican lawyer and politician, deputy (2018-2021).
Thanwa Raseetanu, 50, Thai luk thung singer, COVID-19.
Phil Schaap, 70, American disc jockey and jazz historian.
Badri Spanderashvili, 51, Georgian football player (Spartak Vladikavkaz, Rostov) and manager (Bataysk-2007).
Warren Storm, 84, American swamp pop singer and drummer.
Antoni Tołkaczewski, 87, Polish Olympic swimmer (1952).
Bill White, 76, American professional wrestler (WWE, GCW, JCP).
Eiichi Yamamoto, 80, Japanese film director (Belladonna of Sadness, Little Wansa) and screenwriter (Space Battleship Yamato).
Ameer Zaman, 65, Pakistani politician, MP (2013–2018) and minister of postal services (2017–2018), complications from diabetes.

8
Sir Antony Acland, 91, British diplomat, ambassador to the United States (1986–1991).
Abbas Ansarifard, 65, Iranian football executive, chairman of Persepolis (1990–1993, 2001, 2009), COVID-19.
Derek Bailey, 48, American tribal leader and convicted sex offender, chairman of the Grand Traverse Band of Ottawa and Chippewa Indians (2008–2012).
José Augusto Delgado, 83, Brazilian jurist, judge of the Superior Court of Justice (1995–2008).
Gérard Farison, 77, French footballer (Saint-Étienne, ÉFC Fréjus, national team).
Big Daddy Graham, 68, American radio presenter (WIP-FM) and comedian.
Franco Graziosi, 92, Italian actor (The Terrorist, Duck, You Sucker!, We Have a Pope).
Amy Hawkins, 110, Welsh supercentenarian, nation's oldest person.
Betty Karnette, 89, American politician, member of the California State Assembly (1992–1994, 2004–2008) and Senate (1996–2004).
Guido Lanfranco, 90, Maltese writer.
Mark Litchman, 96, American politician, member of the Washington House of Representatives (1955–1973).
Uno Loop, 91, Estonian singer and musician.
Juan Guillermo López Soto, 74, Mexican Roman Catholic prelate, bishop of Cuauhtémoc-Madera (since 1995), COVID-19.
Dietmar Lorenz, 70, German judoka, Olympic champion (1980).
Aleksandr Melnik, 63, Russian film director (Terra Nova, Territory) and screenwriter, fall.
Art Metrano, 84, American actor (Police Academy, They Shoot Horses, Don't They?, Joanie Loves Chachi) and comedian.
Amobé Mévégué, 52, Cameroonian journalist and radio host, malaria.
Claude Montmarquette, 78, Canadian economist.
Robert Prizeman, 68, British composer.
Pulamaipithan, 85, Indian lyricist (Kudiyirundha Koyil, Neengal Kettavai, Manjal Nila).
Jordi Rebellón, 64, Spanish actor (Hospital Central, Médico de familia, Sin identidad), stroke.
Robert A. Rovner, 77, American politician and lawyer, member of the Pennsylvania State Senate (1971–1974).
Igor Shklyarevsky, 83, Russian poet and translator, COVID-19.
Sadanand Singh, 78, Indian politician, Bihar MLA (1969–2020).
Neddy Smith, 76, Australian serial criminal.
Matthew Strachan, 50, English composer (Who Wants to Be a Millionaire?) and singer-songwriter (Next Door's Baby).
Ludovico Vico, 69, Italian politician, deputy (2006–2013, 2015–2018).
Luis Villafuerte, 86, Filipino politician, minister of trade (1979–1981), governor of Camarines Sur (1986–1992, 1995–2004) and deputy (2004–2013).
Yevgeny Zinichev, 55, Russian politician and military and intelligence officer, minister of emergency situations (since 2018), fall.

9
Borhane Alaouié, 80, Lebanese film director (Kafr kasem, Beyroutou el lika, Khalass).
Marianne Battani, 77, American jurist, judge of the U.S. District Court for Eastern Michigan (since 2000), cancer.
Urbain Braems, 87, Belgian football player (Club Brugge) and manager (Anderlecht, Trabzonspor).
Sir Timothy Colman, 91, British businessman, Lord Lieutenant of Norfolk (1978–2004).
Marian Duś, 83, Polish Roman Catholic prelate, auxiliary bishop of Warsaw (1986–2013).
Caspar Einem, 73, Austrian politician, minister of the interior (1995–1997) and science, traffic and the arts (1997–2000), member of the National Council (2000–2007).
Harold Franklin, 88, American lecturer.
Wiesław Gołas, 90, Polish actor (Dzięcioł, Czterdziestolatek, The Deluge).
Jon Gregory, 77, British film editor (Four Weddings and a Funeral, Secrets & Lies, Three Billboards Outside Ebbing, Missouri).
Magda Harout, 95, American actress (The Nanny, Transylvania Twist).
Jean-Claude van Itallie, 85, Belgian-born American playwright (America Hurrah), pneumonia.
Alicia Iturrioz, 94, Spanish painter and author.
Jean-Paul Jeannotte, 95, Canadian operatic tenor and artistic director (Opéra de Montréal).
Elizabeth Ireland McCann, 90, American theatre producer (Amadeus, The Elephant Man, A View from the Bridge), nine-time Tony winner.
Bruce McFee, 60, Scottish politician, MSP (2003–2007), complications from a stroke.
Richard McGeagh, 77, American water polo player and Olympic swimmer (1964), COVID-19.
Lucette Michaux-Chevry, 92, Guadeloupean politician, deputy (1988–1993) and senator (1995–2011) of France.
Leif Frode Onarheim, 87, Norwegian businessman and politician, MP (2001–2005).
Tarcísio Padilha, 93, Brazilian philosopher, COVID-19.
Hans Pfann, 100, German Olympic gymnast (1952, 1956).
Danilo Popivoda, 74, Slovenian football player (Olimpija, Eintracht Braunschweig, Yugoslavia national team) and manager.
Ferry Radax, 89, Austrian filmmaker.
Helm Stierlin, 95, German psychiatrist.
Albert Kakou Tiapani, 77, Ivorian politician, minister of housing and urban planning (1998–1999).
Trilochan Singh Wazir, 67, Indian politician, Jammu and Kashmir MLC. (body discovered on this date)
Rahimullah Yusufzai, 66, Pakistani journalist (Time, BBC), cancer.

10
Charles Konan Banny, 78, Ivorian politician, prime minister (2005–2007), COVID-19.
Denys Barvinko, 27, Ukrainian footballer (Metalist Kharkiv).
Ben Best, 46, American screenwriter (Eastbound & Down) and actor (Superbad, Land of the Lost).
Les Bettinson, 86, English rugby league player (Salford, Cumberland).
Michael Chapman, 80, English singer-songwriter and guitarist (True North).
Jack Egers, 72, Canadian ice hockey player (New York Rangers, St. Louis Blues, Washington Capitals), pulmonary fibrosis.
Allan Egolf, 83, American politician, member of the Pennsylvania House of Representatives (1993–2004).
Stephen H. Grimes, 93, American jurist, justice of the Supreme Court of Florida (1987–1996).
Chet Hanulak, 88, American football player (Cleveland Browns).
Michael Hoey, 73, British linguist.
Roger Kangni, 77, Togolese Olympic middle-distance runner (1972).
Bulaimu Muwanga Kibirige, 67, Ugandan hotel executive.
Gene Littles, 78, American basketball player (Carolina Cougars) and coach (Cleveland Cavaliers, Charlotte Hornets).
Raymond E. Peet, 100, American vice admiral, commander of the First Fleet (1970–1972).
Concepción Ramírez, 79, Guatemalan peace activist.
Jorge Sampaio, 81, Portuguese lawyer and politician, president (1996–2006) and mayor of Lisbon (1990–1995), respiratory failure.
Dalal bint Saud Al Saud, 63–64, Saudi royal and philanthropist, cancer.
Lars-Henrik Schmidt, 68, Danish philosopher and educator.
Nadir Shah, 57, Bangladeshi cricket umpire, cancer.
Jón Sigurðsson, 75, Icelandic politician, minister of industry and commerce (2006–2007) and governor of the Central Bank of Iceland (2003–2006), prostate cancer.
Byther Smith, 89, American blues musician.
Gordon Spice, 81, British racing driver and car constructor (Spice Engineering), cancer.
Erika Strößenreuther, 83, German Olympic javelin thrower (1960).
Syntar Klas Sunn, 62, Indian politician, Meghalaya MLA (since 2018), COVID-19.
Saadi Yacef, 93, Algerian independence fighter and actor (The Battle of Algiers).
Duygun Yarsuvat, 84, Turkish lawyer and football executive, chairman of Galatasaray (2014–2015).
André Zacharow, 82, Brazilian politician, economist, and lawyer, deputy (2003–2015), COVID-19.

11
Minna Aaltonen, 54, Finnish actress (London's Burning, Lexx) and television host (Gladiaattorit), complications from surgery.
Carlo Alighiero, 94, Italian actor (The Strange Vice of Mrs. Wardh, Milano trema: la polizia vuole giustizia, Silent Action) and voice actor.
Joan Berger, 87, American baseball player (Rockford Peaches).
Mick Flannelly, 91, Irish hurler (Waterford, Mount Sion).
Abimael Guzmán, 86, Peruvian Maoist leader and convicted terrorist, founder of Shining Path.
Audrey Haine, 94, American baseball player (Fort Wayne Daisies, Grand Rapids Chicks, Peoria Redwings).
Aziz Hajini, 64, Indian poet and writer.
Tommy Hazouri, 76, American politician, member of the Florida House of Representatives (1974–1986) and mayor of Jacksonville (1987–1991), lung disease.
Nikolai Kozyrev, 87, Russian diplomat, Soviet and Russian ambassador to Ireland (1991–1998).
Stephan Koranyi, 64, German philologist, lecturer, and editor.
Giulia Daneo Lorimer, 89, Italian violinist and singer.
María Mendiola, 69, Spanish singer (Baccara).
Radmilo Pavlović, 40, Serbian footballer, (Trayal Kruševac, Napredak Kruševac).
Roger Sénié, 101, French politician, mayor of La Bastide-de-Bousignac (1947–2014).
Catherine Sheldrick Ross, 75, Canadian academic, bile duct cancer.
Simon Shnoll, 91, Russian biophysicist and science historian.
Terence Smith, 88, British sailor, Olympic bronze medalist (1956).
Kerry Teague, 60, American racing driver.
Phùng Quang Thanh, 72, Vietnamese military officer and politician, chief of the general staff of the Army (2001–2006) and minister of defence (2006–2016).
Mick Tingelhoff, 81, American Hall of Fame football player (Minnesota Vikings).
Nicolás Villamil, 56, Argentine footballer (Racing Club, Fernández Vial, Concepción), heart attack.
Gloria Warren, 95, American actress (Dangerous Money, Cinderella Swings It, Bells of San Fernando) and singer.

12
Fran Bennett, 84, American actress (Nightingales, Sunset Beach, Wes Craven's New Nightmare).
Bernardino Cano Radil, 65, Paraguayan politician and diplomat, deputy (1989–1998) and ambassador to Cuba (since 2015), COVID-19.
Carlo Chendi, 88, Italian cartoonist.
Marc Clark, 97, British-born Australian sculptor and printmaker.
Thom van Dijck, 92, Dutch Olympic field hockey player (1960).
Jack D. Dunitz, 98, Scottish chemist.
Bob Enyart, 62, American talk radio host and pastor, COVID-19.
Guang Gao, 76, Chinese computer scientist.
Andreas Herczog, 74, Hungarian-born Swiss politician, national councillor (1979–1999), COVID-19.
Sondra James, 82, American sound designer (Sex and the City, Royal Pains) and actress (Joker), lung cancer.
Djohari Kahar, 89, Indonesian politician, MP (1987–1992).
Russ Kick, 52, American writer, editor and publisher.
Michel Maïque, 73, French rugby league player (Lézignan, national team) and politician, mayor of Lézignan-Corbières (2014–2020), pancreatitis.
Wendell Wise Mayes Jr., 97, American radio and cable television executive.
Nicolás Naranjo, 31, Argentine road racing cyclist, traffic collision.
James Snyder Jr., 76, American author, attorney and politician, member of the North Carolina House of Representatives (1969–1973).
John Shelby Spong, 90, American Episcopal prelate, bishop of Newark (1979–2000).
Bruce Spraggins, 82, American basketball player (Philadelphia Tapers, New Jersey Americans).
Fabio Taborre, 36, Italian road racing cyclist.
Giannis Theonas, 80, Greek politician, MEP (1994–2001).
Gunnar Utterberg, 78, Swedish sprint canoer, Olympic champion (1964).
Antonio Verini, 85, Italian politician, deputy (2006), complications from surgery.
Owain Williams, 56, Welsh rugby union player (Glamorgan Wanderers, national team), cancer.

13
Mike Boyle, 77, American politician, mayor of Omaha, Nebraska (1981–1987), pneumonia.
Masuda M Rashid Chowdhury, 70, Bangladeshi politician, MP (since 2019).
Ruly Carpenter, 81, American baseball executive, president of the Philadelphia Phillies (1972–1981).
Reg Chrimes, 96, British politician.
Don Collier, 92, American actor (Outlaws, The High Chaparral, The Young Riders), lung cancer.
Oscar Fernandes, 80, Indian politician, MP (1980–1996, since 1998) and minister of road transport and highways (2013–2014), complications from a fall.
Bob Faehn, 63, American politician, member of the South Dakota House of Representatives (2005–2011), cancer.
Olivier Giscard d'Estaing, 93, French politician, deputy (1968–1973) and co-founder of INSEAD.
Rafiq Hajat, 65, Malawian civil rights activist, heart attack.
Parys Haralson, 37, American football player (Tennessee Volunteers, San Francisco 49ers, New Orleans Saints), stroke.
Antony Hewish, 97, British radio astronomer, Nobel Prize laureate (1974).
Charlotte Johnson Wahl, 79, British painter, complications from Parkinson's disease.
Borisav Jović, 92, Serbian politician, president of the Presidency of Yugoslavia (1990–1991) and secretary general of the Non-Aligned Movement (1990–1991), COVID-19.
Leroy Lewis, 76, Costa Rican football player (Limonense, Uruguay de Coronado) and coach (Belize national team), prostate cancer.
Andrey Makeyev, 69, Russian basketball player, Olympic bronze medalist (1976).
Baruch Nachshon, 82, Israeli artist.
Kathleen Partridge, 57, Australian field hockey player, Olympic champion (1988).
Fern Perrault, 94, Canadian ice hockey player (New York Rangers).
Margaret Purves, 86, British nurse, recipient of the Albert Medal for Lifesaving.
Ruben Reyes, 82, Filipino jurist, associate justice of the Supreme Court (2007–2009).
Rizabawa, 54, Indian actor (In Harihar Nagar, Vakkeel Vasudev, Malappuram Haji Mahanaya Joji), kidney failure.
Fred Stanfield, 77, Canadian ice hockey player (Chicago Blackhawks, Boston Bruins, Buffalo Sabres).
Thommayanti, 85, Thai novelist (Thawiphop, Khu Kam).
Amédée Turner, 92, British politician, MEP (1979–1994).
Colin Urquhart, 81, British neocharismatic preacher, cancer.
Tom Vraalsen, 85, Norwegian politician and diplomat, minister of international development (1989–1990), ambassador to the UK (1994–1996) and the US (1996–2001).
George Wein, 95, American festival promoter and jazz pianist, founder of the Newport Jazz Festival, Newport Folk Festival, and New Orleans Jazz & Heritage Festival.
Earl P. Yates, 97, American navy rear admiral.

14
Joseba Arregui Aramburu, 75, Spanish theologian, academic and politician, member of the Basque Parliament (1999–2001).
Zaitoon Bano, 83, Pakistani feminist writer, poet and broadcaster.
Ansis Bērziņš, 81, Latvian film director and producer (Fantadroms).
Irene Brietzke, 76, Brazilian actress (Doce de Mãe, Antes Que o Mundo Acabe, Seashore).
Caressing, 23, American racehorse and broodmare, complications from laminitis.
David Yonggi Cho, 85, South Korean Christian minister and convicted embezzler, co-founder of Yoido Full Gospel Church, complications from a stroke.
Rob Duhamel, 66, Jersey politician, member of the States Assembly (1993–2014) and minister of planning and environment (2011–2014).
George Ferencz, 74, American theatre director.
James G. Howes, 75, American businessman, heart attack.
Dave Jenks, 79, American author and real estate mogul.
Viktor Kazantsev, 75, Russian military officer, envoy to the Southern Federal District (2000–2004).
Reuben Klamer, 99, American board game inventor (The Game of Life).
Cees Koch, 85, Dutch Olympic shot putter and discus thrower (1960, 1964).
Hubert de Lapparent, 102, French actor.
Fjodor Lishajko, 89, Ukrainian-born Swedish biochemist.
Ladislav Lubina, 54, Czech ice hockey player (HC Pardubice, HC Dukla Jihlava, HC Oceláři Třinec), Olympic bronze medallist (1992), brain cancer.
Lung Shao-hua, 68, Taiwanese actor (10,000 Miles, March of Happiness) and television host (Guess).
Norm Macdonald, 61, Canadian comedian, actor, and screenwriter (Saturday Night Live, The Norm Show, Dirty Work), leukemia.
Antonio Martínez Sarrión, 82, Spanish poet and translator, heart attack.
Ida Nudel, 90, Russian-Israeli civil rights activist.
Guillermo Ortiz Mondragón, 74, Mexican Roman Catholic prelate, bishop of Cuautitlán (since 2005).
Józef Polonek, 72, Polish footballer (Wisła Kraków, Garbarnia Kraków).
Yuriy Sedykh, 66, Ukrainian hammer thrower, Olympic champion (1976, 1980).
Vicente Zarzo Pitarch, 83, Spanish horn player and writer.

15
Philippe Adrien, 81, French actor (Green Harvest) and playwright.
Lou Angotti, 83, Canadian ice hockey player (Chicago Blackhawks, New York Rangers, St. Louis Blues) and coach.
Fazlul Haque Aspia, 85, Bangladeshi politician, MP (1996–2001), dengue virus.
Norman Bailey, 88, British-born American opera singer.
Stephen J. Bonner, Jr., 103, American World War II flying ace.
Alastair Brindle, 82, English rugby league player (Warrington).
Fernando Mario Chávez Ruvalcaba, 88, Mexican Roman Catholic prelate, bishop of Zacatecas (1999–2008), COVID-19.
Shaaron Claridge, 82, American police radio dispatcher and voice actress (Adam-12).
Carl DePasqua, 93, American college football player (Pittsburgh Panthers) and coach (Waynesburg Yellow Jackets).
Leta Powell Drake, 83, American broadcaster and television executive (KOLN).
Ephraim Einhorn, 103, Austrian-born British Orthodox rabbi.
Robert Fyfe, 90, Scottish actor (Last of the Summer Wine, Around the World in 80 Days, Cloud Atlas), kidney disease.
Leonard Gibbs, 73, American percussionist, prostate cancer.
Elinor Miller Greenberg, 88, American author.
Penny Harrington, 79, American police officer.
Satoshi Hirayama, 91, American baseball player (Hiroshima Carp).
Justín Javorek, 85, Slovak football player (Inter Bratislava, Czechoslovakia national team) and manager (Tatran Prešov).
Žana Lelas, 51, Croatian basketball player, Olympic silver medalist (1988).
Mary Mahoney, 81, Australian physician.
Marthe Mercadier, 92, French actress (Three Telegrams, The Night Is My Kingdom, Rendezvous in Grenada).
Frank Mitchell, 95, Canadian politician, British Columbia MLA (1951–1952, 1979–1986).
W. Tayloe Murphy Jr., 88, American politician, member of the Virginia House of Delegates (1982–2000) and Virginia secretary of natural resources (2002–2006).
Gavan O'Herlihy, 70, Irish-born American actor (Never Say Never Again, Willow, Happy Days).
Doris Piserchia, 92, American science fiction writer.
Joel Rapp, 87, American film director and television writer (High School Big Shot, McHale's Navy, Gilligan's Island).
Thomas Ryan, 91, Irish artist and designer.
Bill Sudakis, 75, American baseball player (Los Angeles Dodgers, Texas Rangers, New York Yankees).
Dany Toussaint, 64, Haitian military officer and politician, senator.

16
Sir Silas Atopare, 70, Papua New Guinean politician, governor-general (1997–2004).
Vilborg Dagbjartsdóttir, 91, Icelandic writer.
Boet van Dulmen, 73, Dutch motorcycle road racer, traffic collision.
Charlie Evans, 79, Australian rules footballer (Footscray, South Melbourne).
Sverre Fornes, 89, Norwegian footballer (Rosenborg).
Alan Fox, 85, Welsh footballer (Wrexham, Hartlepool United, Bradford City).
Dušan Ivković, 77, Serbian Hall of Fame basketball player and coach (Partizan, Olympiacos, Yugoslavia national team), pulmonary edema.
Geir Johnson, 68, Norwegian composer and writer.
Kohwe, 75, Ghanaian actor and comedian, complications from a stroke.
Hicham El-Mashtoub, 49, Lebanese-born Canadian football player (Houston Oilers, Edmonton Eskimos), cancer.
František Maxa, 98, Czech Olympic sport shooter (1952, 1956).
Hlengiwe Mkhize, 69, South African politician, MP (since 2009), minister of home affairs (2017) and higher education (2017–2018).
George Mraz, 77, Czech-born American jazz musician (Quest, New York Jazz Quartet, The Thad Jones/Mel Lewis Orchestra).
Casimir Oyé-Mba, 79, Gabonese politician, prime minister (1990–1994), COVID-19.
Margarita Ponomaryova, 58, Russian Olympic hurdler (1992).
Jane Powell, 92, American actress (A Date with Judy, Seven Brides for Seven Brothers, Royal Wedding), singer and dancer.
Juli Reding, 85, American actress (Tormented).
Steve Riley, 68, American football player (Minnesota Vikings).
John Ruggie, 76, American political scientist.
Graciete Santana, 40, Brazilian Olympic long-distance runner (2016), melanoma.
Sir Clive Sinclair, 81, English entrepreneur and inventor, founder of Sinclair Radionics, Sinclair Research and Sinclair Vehicles.
David Stenshoel, 71, American musician (Boiled in Lead)
Ruth C. Sullivan, 97, American autism advocate.
David Sweeney, 61, American-born Canadian Olympic sailor (1984, 1988, 1992).
Tim Thorne, 77, Australian poet.
Alexandra Vydrina, 33, Russian linguist (Kakabe language).

17
Angela Ballara, 77, New Zealand historian.
Abdelaziz Bouteflika, 84, Algerian politician, president (1999–2019), minister of foreign affairs (1963–1979) and president of the U.N. General Assembly (1974–1975), cardiac arrest.
Ted E. Brewerton, 96, Canadian-born American missionary, general authority of the Church of Jesus Christ of Latter-day Saints (since 1978).
Roger Brown, 84, American Hall of Fame football player (Maryland State Hawks, Detroit Lions, Los Angeles Rams).
Rafael Consuegra, 80, Cuban sculptor.
Jonathan Cooper, 58, British barrister and human rights activist, co-founder of the Human Dignity Trust.
Russ Dallen, 58, American economist.
Dottie Dodgion, 91, American drummer and singer, complications from a stroke.
Tim Donnelly, 77, American actor (Emergency!, The Secret of Santa Vittoria, The Toolbox Murders).
Avril Elgar, 89, English actress (Spring and Port Wine, The Medusa Touch, George and Mildred).
Carlos Gianelli, 73, Uruguayan lawyer and diplomat, ambassador to the United States (2005–2012, 2015–2020), heart attack.
Basil Hoffman, 83, American actor (The Artist, Hill Street Blues, Santa Barbara).
Kemal Kurspahić, 74, Bosnian journalist (Oslobođenje) and diplomat.
Albert Linder, 25, Kazakhstani weightlifter.
Murtaza Lodhgar, 45, Indian cricketer (Bengal), heart attack.
Alban Lynch, 91, Australian mining engineer.
Alfred Miodowicz, 92, Polish trade unionist and politician, deputy (1985–1989).
Barry Norsworthy, 69, Australian footballer (Melbourne).
Constantin Olteanu, 75, Romanian footballer (Argeș Pitești), Olympic team (1972).
Thanu Padmanabhan, 64, Indian theoretical physicist, heart attack.
Ronald Paris, 88, German painter and graphic artist.
Alfonso Sastre, 95, Spanish playwright, essayist, and critic.
Tony Scott, 80, English footballer (West Ham United, Aston Villa, Torquay United).
J. V. Smith, 95, English rugby union player (Cambridge University, national team).
Minja Subota, 82, Serbian television host.
Wataru Takeshita, 74, Japanese politician, member of the House of Representatives (since 2000), esophageal cancer.
Michał Turkiewicz, 64, Polish politician and teacher, deputy (2001–2005).

18
Julos Beaucarne, 85, Belgian singer, writer and actor (The Mystery of the Yellow Room).
Jean-Patrice Brosse, 71, French harpsichordist and organist.
Mario Camus, 86, Spanish film director and screenwriter (La colmena, The Holy Innocents, The House of Bernarda Alba).
Anna Chromý, 81, Czech painter and sculptor.
Iris Davis, 71, American Olympic sprinter (1972).
Leo De Lyon, 95, American actor (Top Cat).
Aquilino Duque, 90, Spanish poet and writer.
Anto Finnegan, 48, Northern Irish Gaelic footballer (Antrim), motor neurone disease.
José-Augusto França, 98, Portuguese historian, art critic and professor.
Ali Kalora, 40, Indonesian Islamic militant, leader of the East Indonesia Mujahideen (since 2016), shot.
Jolidee Matongo, 46, South African politician, mayor of Johannesburg (since 2021), traffic collision.
Neil McCarthy, 81, American college basketball coach (Weber State Wildcats, New Mexico State Aggies).
Mick McGinty, 68, American artist (Street Fighter II), lung cancer.
Fakhreddin Mousavi, 90–91, Iranian judge and politician, three-time MP and member of the Assembly of Experts (since 2016).
Albert J. Raboteau, 78, American religion scholar, dean of Princeton University Graduate School (1992–1993).
Gudmund Restad, 83, Norwegian politician, MP (1985–2001) and minister of finance (1997–2000).
Christoph Schwöbel, 66, German theologian.
Charles Scot-Brown, 98, Canadian World War II veteran, Legion of Honour recipient.
Kumiko Serizawa, 92, Japanese-American dollmaker.
Chris Anker Sørensen, 37, Danish road racing cyclist, traffic collision.
Kristoffer Stensrud, 67, Norwegian investor.

19
Godil Prasad Anuragi, 92, Indian politician, MP (1980–1984).
Ama Benyiwa-Doe, 71, Ghanaian politician, MP (1992–2004).
Françoise Bernard, 100, French gastronomic author and television presenter.
James Bilbray, 83, American politician and postal executive, member of the U.S. House of Representatives (1987–1995) and chairman of the Board of Governors of the USPS (2014–2016).
Richard Buckley, 72, American journalist and writer.
Sylvano Bussotti, 89, Italian composer, poet, and artistic director (La Fenice, Festival Puccini).
John Carroll, 91, American lawyer and politician, member of the Hawaii House of Representatives (1971–1979) and Senate (1979–1981).
John Challis, 79, English actor (Only Fools and Horses, The Green Green Grass, Benidorm) and comedian, cancer.
Cheung Yan-lung, 99, Hong Kong businessman and politician, member of the Legislative Council (1981–1991), chairman of the Regional Council (1986–1991) and the HYK (1964–1966).
Stephen Critchlow, 54, British actor (The Infinite Worlds of H. G. Wells, Kenneth Williams: Fantabulosa!, Star Wars: The Old Republic).
Steve Davisson, 63, American politician, member of the Indiana House of Representatives (since 2010), cancer.
Nilay Dutta, 68, Indian lawyer, cricket administrator, and umpire.
Dame Jocelyn Fish, 90, New Zealand women's rights advocate.
Jimmy Greaves, 81, English Hall of Fame footballer (Chelsea, Tottenham Hotspur, national team), world champion (1966).
Richard Lachmann, 65, American sociologist.
András Ligeti, 68, Hungarian violinist and conductor.
Terry Long, 86, English football player (Crystal Palace) and coach.
*Luis Gustavo, 87, Brazilian actor (Beto Rockfeller, Elas por Elas, Sai de Baixo), cancer.
Obadiah Mailafia, 64, Nigerian economist and politician, deputy governor of the Central Bank of Nigeria (2005–2007).
Joan Martínez Vilaseca, 78, Spanish football player (Espanyol, Levante) and manager.
Ole Nordhaug, 96, Norwegian Lutheran clergyman, bishop of Møre (1983–1991).
Mats Paulson, 83, Swedish singer-songwriter ("Barfotavisan", "Visa vid vindens ängar") and painter.
Morris Perry, 96, English actor (Nothing but the Night, The Avengers, Z-Cars).
Gabby Petito, 22, American vandweller, homicide. (body discovered on this date)
Ronald F. Probstein, 93, American engineer.
Tomáš Prokop, 27, Czech ice hockey player (Mountfield HK, Motor České Budějovice, Draci Šumperk).
María del Carmen Rovira Gaspar, 98, Spanish historian, researcher and academic.
Allan Slaight, 90, Canadian magician, media mogul, and philanthropist.
Dinky Soliman, 68, Filipino politician, secretary of social welfare and development (2001–2005, 2010–2016), complications from kidney and heart failure.
Willie Spencer, 68, American football player (New York Giants, Minnesota Vikings).
Marina Tucaković, 67, Serbian lyricist ("Ovo je Balkan", "Nije ljubav stvar", "Ljubav je svuda"), complications from cancer and COVID-19.
Charles Vardis, 35, Ghanaian footballer (Accra Hearts of Oak, New Edubiase United, Maccabi Herzliya).
Petter Vennerød, 72, Norwegian film director (Lasse & Geir, Drømmeslottet, Bryllupsfesten).
Liam Walsh, 23, English rugby league player (Widnes Vikings).
Max Wiltshire, 83, Welsh rugby union player (Aberavon RFC, Barbarian, national team).

20
Colin Bailey, 87, English-born American jazz drummer, post-COVID-19 pneumonia.
Sherwood Boehlert, 84, American politician, member of the U.S. House of Representatives (1983–2007) and chair of the House Science Committee (2001–2007).
Cloyd Boyer, 94, American baseball player (St. Louis Cardinals).
Peter Bunnell, 83, American author, scholar and photography historian.
Angelo Codevilla, 78, Italian-born American international relations scholar, traffic collision.
Sarah Dash, 76, American singer (Labelle).
Jackie De Caluwé, 87, Belgian footballer (Cercle Brugge).
Guy Friedrich, 93, French footballer (Angers SCO, CO Roubaix-Tourcoing).
Chauncey Howell, 86, American journalist (Women's Wear Daily, The New York Times, WNBC).
Willy Holzmüller, 90, German footballer (SC Motor Karl-Marx-Stadt, East Germany national team).
Roland Jaccard, 79, Swiss writer, journalist and literary critic, suicide by barbiturate overdose.
Jan Jindra, 89, Czech rower, Olympic champion (1952).
Aloys Jousten, 83, Belgian Roman Catholic prelate, bishop of Liège (2001–2013).
Vidyadhar Karmakar, 96, Indian actor (Karthik Calling Karthik, Ek Thi Daayan, Veerey Ki Wedding).
Claude Lombard, 76, Belgian singer ("Quand tu reviendras").
Keith Macdonald, 88, Scottish rugby union player (Barbarians, national team).
Billy Maxwell, 92, American golfer (PGA Tour, Champions Tour), U.S. Amateur winner (1951).
Charles W. Mills, 70, Jamaican philosopher.
Mat Noh, 67, Singaporean footballer (national team).
Helmut Oberlander, 97, Ukrainian-born Canadian World War II soldier, member of the Einsatzgruppen.
Marcia H. Rioux, 74, Canadian legal scholar.
Yudhvir Singh Judev, 39, Indian politician, Chhattisgarh MLA (2008–2018).
Henry Stelling, 97, American Army major general.
Pavel Țugui, 99, Romanian political activist and literary historian. (death announced on this date)
Jim Van Engelenhoven, 78, American politician, member of the Iowa House of Representatives (1999–2012).
John H. Walter, 93, American mathematician.
Ken Worden, 78, English football player (Hobart Juventus) and manager (F.A. Selangor, Malaysia national team).

21
Aharon Abuhatzira, 82, Israeli politician and convicted fraudster, member of the Knesset (1977–1992), minister of religions (1977–1981) and labor (1981–1982).
Kurt Boese, 91, German-born Canadian Olympic wrestler (1960).
Enea Cerquetti, 83, Italian politician, mayor of Cinisello Balsamo (1970–1979) and of Cusano Milanino (1990–1994).
Dallas Dempster, 80, Australian property developer (Burswood Resort and Casino), traffic collision.
Constance van Eeden, 94, Dutch mathematical statistician.
Romano Fogli, 83, Italian football player (Bologna, Milan, national team) and manager.
Marcia Freedman, 83, American-Israeli peace activist, MK (1974–1977).
Willie Garson, 57, American actor (Sex and the City, White Collar, John from Cincinnati), pancreatic cancer.
Rae German, 80, Canadian football player (Hamilton Tiger-Cats).
Marilyn Golden, 67, American disability advocate.
Al Harrington, 85, Samoan-American actor (Hawaii Five-O), stroke.
Rumi Kazama, 55, Japanese professional wrestler (DDT, JWP), promoter (LLPW) and kickboxer.
Sir Maurice King, 85, Barbadian lawyer and politician, minister of foreign affairs, foreign trade and international business (1989–1993).
Richard H. Kirk, 65, English electronic musician (Cabaret Voltaire, Sweet Exorcist) and songwriter ("Yashar").
La Prieta Linda, 88, Mexican singer and actress (Valente Quintero).
Joan Howard Maurer, 94, American writer and actress (Swing Your Lady, Love in a Bungalow).
John Brendan McCormack, 86, American Roman Catholic prelate, bishop of Manchester (1998–2011).
Jack Minore, 82, American politician, member of the Michigan House of Representatives (1999–2004).
Violet Oaklander, 94, American psychotherapist.
Janet G. Osteryoung, 82, American chemist.
Peter Palmer, 90, American actor (Li'l Abner, Custer).
George R. Pettit, 92, American chemist.
Anthony Pilla, 88, American Roman Catholic prelate, auxiliary bishop (1979–1980) and bishop (1980–2006) of Cleveland.
Frank Pratt, 79, American politician, member of the Arizona House of Representatives (2009–2017, since 2021) and Senate (2017–2021).
Carlos Ramos Núñez, 61, Peruvian jurist and academic, justice of the Constitutional Court (since 2014), cardiac arrest.
Mohamed Hussein Tantawi, 85, Egyptian field marshal and politician, chairman of the Supreme Council of the Armed Forces (2011–2012) and minister of defense (1991–2012).
Melvin Van Peebles, 89, American film director, actor and playwright (Sweet Sweetback's Baadasssss Song, Posse, Ain't Supposed to Die a Natural Death).
Günter Wienhold, 73, German Olympic footballer (1972).

22
Eric Alfasi, 49, Israeli basketball player (Maccabi Netanya) and coach (Maccabi Ashdod, Hapoel Eilat), COVID-19.
Pieter Beelaerts van Blokland, 88, Dutch politician, deputy (1981), mayor of Amstelveen (1971–1977) and Hengelo (1981–1985, 1999–2000).
Abdelkader Bensalah, 79, Algerian politician, acting head of state (2019), president of the Transitional Council/People's Assembly (1994–2002) and the Council of the Nation (2002–2019), cancer complicated by COVID-19.
Odile Caradec, 96, French poet.
Tom Carroll, 85, American baseball player (New York Yankees, Kansas City Athletics).
Huang Hongjia, 97, Chinese physicist, member of the Chinese Academy of Sciences.
Axel Gehrke, 79, German politician, MP (since 2017).
Lois Horton, 78, American historian, stroke.
Peter Howitt, 93, English set decorator (Who Framed Roger Rabbit, Elizabeth, Braveheart).
Tari Ito, 70, Japanese performance artist, complications from amyotrophic lateral sclerosis.
Colin Jones, 85, English photographer and ballet dancer, COVID-19.
Doğan Kuban, 95, Turkish architectural historian.
Laura Marcus, 65, British literature scholar, pancreatic cancer.
Orlando Martínez, 77, Cuban boxer, Olympic champion (1972).
Roger Michell, 65, South African-born British film director (Notting Hill, Venus, My Cousin Rachel).
Bob Moore, 88, American Hall of Fame session bassist (The Nashville A-Team) and orchestra leader.
Nenad Nenadović, 56, Serbian actor and television host, COVID-19.
Ulf Nilsson, 73, Swedish children's author.
Mike Overy, 70, American baseball player (California Angels).
Jim Pehler, 79, American politician, member of the Minnesota House of Representatives (1973–1980) and Senate (1981–1990).
Floyd Sagely, 89, American football player (San Francisco 49ers, Chicago Cardinals).
Jay Sandrich, 89, American Hall of Fame television director (The Mary Tyler Moore Show, The Cosby Show, Soap), 4-time Emmy winner.
Jan Stanienda, 68, Polish violinist and conductor.
Jüri Tamm, 64, Estonian politician and hammer thrower, Olympic bronze medalist (1980, 1988), MP (1999–2011).
André Vauchez, 82, French politician, mayor of Tavaux (1977–2001) and deputy (1997–2002).
Eliyantha White, 48, Sri Lankan spiritual healer, COVID-19.

23
Kjell Askildsen, 91, Norwegian writer.
Pål Benum, 86, Norwegian Olympic runner (1964).
Jules Chametzky, 93, American literary critic and writer.
David H. DePatie, 91, American film and television producer (The Pink Panther), co-founder of DePatie–Freleng Enterprises.
Andy Douglas, 89, American jurist, justice of the Supreme Court of Ohio (1985–2002), pulmonary fibrosis.
John Elliott, 79, Australian businessman, president of the Carlton Football Club (1983–2002), complications from a fall.
Pee Wee Ellis, 80, American saxophonist, composer and arranger.
Taito Phillip Field, 68, Samoan-born New Zealand politician, MP (1993–2008).
Bruce Fleisher, 72, American golfer (PGA Tour, Champions Tour), U.S. Amateur winner (1968), cancer.
Edward Janiak, 69, Polish Roman Catholic prelate, auxiliary bishop of Wrocław (1996–2012) and bishop of Kalisz (2012–2020), lung cancer.
Natalie Meyer, 91, American politician, secretary of state of Colorado (1983–1995).
Daniel Mio, 80, French teacher and politician, mayor of Rieulay (1977–2006).
John Mitchell, 80, New Zealand historian.
Hans Nordin, 90, Swedish Olympic ski jumper (1952).
Billa O'Connell, 91, Irish pantomimer.
Jan Piecyk, 81, Polish footballer (GKS Katowice). (death announced on this date)
Gholamali Raisozzakerin, 82, Iranian anthropologist, poet, and singer.
Sharad Ranpise, 70, Indian politician, Maharashtra MLC (since 2018).
Roberto Roena, 81, Puerto Rican salsa percussionist, orchestra leader, and dancer.
Charles Grier Sellers, 98, American historian.
Gerald Sveen, 96, American politician, member of the North Dakota House of Representatives (1993–2000).
John August Swanson, 83, American visual artist.
Mervyn Taylor, 89, Irish politician, TD (1981–1997) and minister for labour (1993).
Sue Thompson, 96, American pop and country singer ("Sad Movies (Make Me Cry)", "Norman").
Jorge Liberato Urosa Savino, 79, Venezuelan Roman Catholic cardinal, archbishop of Valencia (1990–2005) and Caracas (2005–2018), COVID-19.
Nino Vaccarella, 88, Italian racecar driver.
Yogendra Vyas, 80, Indian Gujarati-language writer and linguist, suicide.
Andrew Webster, 69–70, British sociologist.

24
Emmanuel Agassi, 90, Iranian-American Olympic boxer (representing Iran 1948, 1952).
Julhas Uddin Ahmed, 87, Bangladeshi Nazrul Geet singer and teacher, dengue virus.
Robert Altman, 76, American photographer.
Eric Cassell, 93, American physician and bioethicist.
Ihor Cherkun, 56, Ukrainian football player (Torpedo Zaporizhzhia, Metalurh Zaporizhzhia, Viktor Zaporizhzhia) and manager.
Cornelia Clark, 71, American jurist, justice of the Tennessee Supreme Court (since 2005), cancer.
William E. Davis, 92, American academic administrator, president of Idaho State University (1965–1975) and University of New Mexico (1975–1982).
Eugeniusz Faber, 82, Polish footballer (Ruch Chorzów, Lens, national team).
Gomaa Frahat, 80, Egyptian political cartoonist.
Freddie Fu, 70, Hong Kong-American orthopaedic surgeon, melanoma.
Jitender Mann Gogi, 38, Indian mobster, shot.
Grey Gowrie, 81, British politician, businessman, and arts administrator, chancellor of the Duchy of Lancaster (1984–1985).
Ishfaq Nadeem Ahmad, Pakistani military officer, chief of general staff (2013–2015), cardiac arrest.
Diana Natalicio, 82, American academic administrator, president of the University of Texas at El Paso (1988–2019).
Waka Nathan, 81, New Zealand rugby union player (Auckland, national team).
Ota, 67, Brazilian cartoonist.
Raymundo Joseph Peña, 87, American Roman Catholic prelate, bishop of El Paso (1980–1995) and Brownsville (1995–2009).
Lenka Peterson, 95, American actress (Quilters, Headin' for Broadway, Dragnet).
Paul Quilès, 79, French politician, deputy (1993–2007), minister of defence (1985–1986) and the interior (1992–1993), cancer.
Takao Saito, 84, Japanese manga artist (Golgo 13), pancreatic cancer.
Staffan Skott, 78, Swedish writer and journalist.
Valeriy Skvortsov, 76, Ukrainian Olympic high jumper (1964, 1968).
Harold Tanasichuk, 83, Canadian curler.
Jorge Velasco Mackenzie, 72, Ecuadorian writer.
Robert R. Weber, 95, American politician, member of the South Dakota House of Representatives (1973–2000).

25
Len Ashurst, 82, English football player (Sunderland, Hartlepool United) and manager (Cardiff City).
Théoneste Bagosora, 80, Rwandan military officer and convicted war criminal.
Dean Berta Viñales, 15, Spanish motorcycle racer, race collision.
Kamla Bhasin, 75, Indian feminist activist.
Swapan Kumar Chakravorty, 67, Indian academic, chairman of CSSSC (since 2020), complications from COVID-19.
Henri Cirelli, 86, Luxembourgian footballer (Avenir Beggen, Swift Hesperange, F91 Diddeleng).
Franco Di Giuseppe, 79, Italian politician, deputy (1992–1994), complications from traffic collision.
Marcello Diomedi, 78, Italian footballer (ACF Fiorentina, Bari, Pol. Alghero).
Richard J. Eden, 99, British theoretical physicist.
Antonio Franco, 74, Spanish journalist (El Periódico de Catalunya, El País).
Elmer Fung, 73, Taiwanese politician, member of the Legislative Yuan (1999–2002), cancer.
Hassan Hassanzadeh Amoli, 92, Iranian Islamic scholar, lung disease.
Bo Kaiser, 91, Swedish Olympic sailor (1964).
Lam Yuen-yee, 36–37, Hong Kong marine police officer, drowned.
Patricio Manns, 84, Chilean singer, composer ("Arriba en la Cordillera") and writer, heart failure.
Greg Miskiw, 71, British journalist (News of the World), lung cancer.
Pierre Montastruc, 89, French politician, deputy (1986–1988).
Carlos Neder, 67, Brazilian politician and physician, São Paulo MLA (2005–2007, 2010–2011, 2013–2019), COVID-19.
Greg Parke, 73, Australian footballer (Melbourne, Footscray, Norwood).
Al Ramsawack, 91, Trinidadian folklorist.
Ian Riddell, 82–84, Scottish footballer (St Mirren, Berwick Rangers).
Walter Scott Jr., 90, American civil engineer, CEO of Kiewit Corporation (1979–1998).
Sergei Shuvalov, 70, Russian politician, chairman of the Saratov Oblast Duma (2002–2005) and senator (2005–2010), COVID-19.
Thomas A Waldmann, 91, American immunologist.
Marie Wilcox, 87, American lexicographer, last fluent speaker of the Wukchumni dialect.
Valree Fletcher Wynn, 99, American academic.
Mehdi Yaghoubi, 91, Iranian wrestler, Olympic silver medallist (1956), heart disease.

26
Siamak Atlasi, 85, Iranian actor (Ballad of Tara, A Man Without a Shadow), COVID-19.
Jaison Barreto, 88, Brazilian physician and politician, deputy (1971–1979) and senator (1979–1987).
Ann Breault, 82, Canadian politician, New Brunswick MLA (1987–1999).
Eliécer Cárdenas, 70, Ecuadorian novelist.
José Freire Falcão, 95, Brazilian Roman Catholic cardinal, bishop of Limoeiro do Norte (1967–1971), archbishop of Teresina (1971–1984) and Brasília (1984–2004), COVID-19.
Frances Farenthold, 94, American politician, member of the Texas House of Representatives (1969–1973), complications from Parkinson's disease.
Zumrud Gulu-zade, 89, Azerbaijani philosopher.
Karl-Sören Hedlund, 83, Swedish ice hockey player (Västerås, Skellefteå AIK, national team).
Syarhey Herasimets, 55, Belarusian football player (Dinamo Minsk, national team) and manager (Junior Sevan).
Kjersti Holmen, 65, Norwegian actress (Orion's Belt, Rød snø, The Telegraphist).
Alan Lancaster, 72, English rock bassist (Status Quo, The Party Boys), complications from multiple sclerosis.
Al Mantello, 87, Australian footballer (North Melbourne).
Ndakasi, 14, Congolese mountain gorilla.
Heini Paas, 102, Estonian art historian.
Jean-Pierre Pénicaut, 84, French politician, deputy (1980–1993).
Paddy Prendergast, 95, Irish Gaelic footballer (Mayo GAA).
Kirill Razlogov, 75, Russian film critic and cultural researcher.
Herzl Shafir, 92, Israeli general, commissioner of Israel Police (1980).
Mark Strudwick, 76, British military officer, general officer commanding Scotland (1997–2000).
Pearl Tytell, 104, American criminologist.
Bobby Zarem, 84, American publicist (Dustin Hoffman, Cher, Arnold Schwarzenegger), lung cancer.

27
Martin Burleigh, 70, English footballer (Darlington, Carlisle United, Hartlepool United).
B. B. Dutta, 83, Indian politician, MP (1993–1999).
François Florent, 84, French theatre actor, founder of the Cours Florent.
Francisco Franco del Amo, 61, Spanish academic and author.
Rudy Haluza, 90, American Olympic race walker (1960, 1968).
Gordon Hudson, 59, American football player (BYU Cougars, Los Angeles Express, Seattle Seahawks).
Roger Hunt, 83, English Hall of Fame footballer (Liverpool, Bolton Wanderers, national team), world champion (1966).
Bengt K. Å. Johansson, 84, Swedish politician, minister of consumer affairs (1985–1988) and public administration (1988–1991), governor of Älvsborg County (1991–1997).
David Komansky, 82, American investment management executive, CEO of Merrill Lynch (1996–2002).
Pocha Lamadrid, 76, Argentine anti-racism activist.
Heinz Lieven, 93, German actor (Group Portrait with a Lady, Das Rätsel der Sandbank, This Must Be the Place).
Egil Lillestøl, 83, Norwegian particle physicist.
Cecilia Lindqvist, 89, Swedish sinologist.
Andrea Martin, 49, American singer-songwriter ("I Love Me Some Him", "Before You Walk Out of My Life", "Don't Let Go"), and record producer.
James L. Mathewson, 83, American politician, member of the Missouri House of Representatives (1975–1981) and Senate (1981–2005).
Ibrahim Mbombo Njoya, 83, Cameroonian politician and royal, king of the Bamum people (since 1992), COVID-19.
Viktor Mikhailov, 97, Russian military officer, head of the Riga Higher Military Political School (1977–1987).
Boban Petrović, 64, Serbian basketball player (Partizan, Yugoslavia national team).
R. R. Venkat, 54, Indian film producer (Divorce Invitation, Lovely, Damarukam), kidney disease.
Ülo Vilimaa, 80, Estonian dancer, choreographer, and painter.

28
Nana Ampadu, 76, Ghanaian musician.
Karan Armstrong, 79, American operatic soprano.
Nasser al-Awlaki, 74–75, Yemeni academic and politician, president of Sanaa University and minister of agriculture (1988–1990).
Will Bagley, 71, American historian and writer (Blood of the Prophets).
Bala V. Balachandran, 84, Indian educationist, founder of the Great Lakes Institute of Management.
Ed Beauvais, 84, American airline executive.
James Buswell, 74, American violinist.
Robert Gibanel, 89, French racing cyclist.
Paul Girod, 90, French politician, mayor of Droizy (since 1958) and senator (1978–2008).
Wajid Shamsul Hasan, Pakistani diplomat.
Edward Helfrick, 93, American politician, member of the Pennsylvania House of Representatives (1977–1980) and Senate (1981–2003).
Eberhard Jüngel, 86, German theologian.
Tommy Kirk, 79, American actor (Old Yeller, The Shaggy Dog, Swiss Family Robinson).
Princess Lalla Malika of Morocco, 88, Moroccan royal.
Bienvenido Lumbera, 89, Filipino poet, critic, and dramatist.
Farida Majid, 79, Bangladeshi poet, translator, and academic, cancer.
Ed Mason, 75, Canadian newscaster, complications from surgery.
Vassi Naidoo, 66, South African businessman.
Phi Nhung, 51, Vietnamese-American singer and actress, COVID-19.
Achille Pace, 98, Italian painter.
Bruno Pavelić, 84, Serbian basketball player (Beograd, Mladost Zemun).
B. Satyaji Rao, 91, Indian cricket umpire.
Mike Renzi, 80, American composer and music director (Sesame Street).
Maria Roka, 81, Hungarian Olympic sprint canoer (1964).
Barry Ryan, 72, British pop singer ("Eloise") and photographer.
Lonnie Smith, 79, American jazz musician, pulmonary fibrosis.
Ray Snell, 63, American football player (Tampa Bay Buccaneers, Pittsburgh Steelers, Detroit Lions).
Moshe David Tendler, 95, American rabbi and biologist.
Stephen Thega, 75, Kenyan Olympic boxer (1968, 1972).
Michael Tylo, 73, American actor (The Young and the Restless, Zorro, Guiding Light).
Jacques Vivier, 90, French racing cyclist.
Wang Jianmin, 78, Chinese shàngjiàng, commander of the Chengdu Military Region (2002–2007).
Fred Woudhuizen, 62, Dutch philologist.
Alan Woods, 84, English footballer (Tottenham Hotspur, Swansea City, York City).
Andrei Zeltser, 31, Belarusian IT worker, shot.

29
Kune Amini, 56, Papua New Guinean cricketer (national team).
Ottavio Compagnoni, 95, Italian Olympic cross-country skier (1952, 1956, 1960).
Joe Davis, 98, American politician, member of the Florida House of Representatives (1962–1966).
Alexandre José Maria dos Santos, 97, Mozambican Roman Catholic cardinal, archbishop of Maputo (1976–2003).
Carsten Eggers, 64, German sculptor and painter.
Benno Friesen, 92, Canadian politician, MP (1974–1993).
Antonio Gasset, 75, Spanish journalist and television host (Días de cine).
Hayko, 48, Armenian singer ("Anytime You Need") and songwriter, COVID-19.
Ravil Isyanov, 59, Russian-born American actor (GoldenEye, K-19: The Widowmaker, Transformers: Dark of the Moon), cancer.
Bronius Kutavičius, 89, Lithuanian composer.
Olivier Libaux, 57, French record producer and musician (Nouvelle Vague).
Chuck Lindstrom, 85, American baseball player (Chicago White Sox).
Lee Vernon McNeill, 56, American Olympic sprinter (1988), COVID-19.
Mohibullah, 46, Burmese Rohingya rights advocate, shot.
Glyn Moses, 93, Welsh rugby league player (Salford, St Helens, national team).
Julia Nixon, 66, American singer, complications from COVID-19.
Lee Quarnstrom, 81, American journalist.
Koteswara Rao, 91, Indian engineer.
Heiko Salzwedel, 64, German racing cyclist and manager.
Jim Service, 88, Australian company director.
Sabam Sirait, 84, Indonesian politician, five-time MP .
Ivan Tasovac, 55, Serbian pianist, manager, and politician, minister of culture and information (2013–2016) and deputy (since 2020).
Claire Van Ummersen, 86, American scholar and academic administrator, president of Cleveland State University (1993–2001), traffic collision.
Jim Ursel, 84, Canadian curler, cancer.
Angelo Vasta, 80, Australian judge, member of the Supreme Court of Queensland (1984–1989).
François Vérove, 59, French serial killer (Murder of Cécile Bloch) and police officer, suicide by barbiturate overdose.

30
Lennart Åberg, 79, Swedish jazz saxophonist and composer.
Beatrix, Countess of Schönburg-Glauchau, 91, Hungarian-born German aristocrat and socialite.
Jacques Bellanger, 90, French politician, senator (1986–1995, 1997–2004).
Aboagye Brenya, 83, Ghanaian actor.
Clement Chiwaya, 50, Malawian politician, MP (2014–2019), suicide by gunshot.
Luigi Conti, 80, Italian Roman Catholic prelate, bishop of Macerata-Tolentino-Recanati-Cingoli-Treia (1996–2006) and archbishop of Fermo (2006–2017).
Isabel Cruz, Portuguese-born American computer scientist. (death announced on this date)
Rafael Kamil Dzhabrailov, 62, Azerbaijani politician, MP (2005–2020), COVID-19.
Carlisle Floyd, 95, American opera composer.
Jenny Kirk, 76, New Zealand politician, MP (1987–1990).
Vladislav Lemish, 51, Azerbaijani footballer (Kuban Krasnodar, CSKA Moscow, national team).
Xicoténcatl Leyva Mortera, 81, Mexican politician, governor of Baja California (1983–1989), lung cancer.
Hassan Tarighat Monfared, 75, Iranian physician and politician, minister of health and medical education (2012–2013), fall.
Donna Nalewaja, 81, American politician, member of the North Dakota House of Representatives (1983–1986) and Senate (1987–1998), COVID-19.
Philip Owen, 88, Canadian politician, mayor of Vancouver (1993–2002), complications from Parkinson's disease.
José Pérez Francés, 84, Spanish road racing cyclist.
Palmer Pyle, 84, American football player (Baltimore Colts, Minnesota Vikings, Oakland Raiders).
John Rigas, 96, American cable television executive and convicted fraudster, co-founder of the Adelphia Communications Corporation and owner of the Buffalo Sabres (1997–2005).
Ary Rigo, 74, Brazilian politician, vice-governor of Mato Grosso do Sul (1991–1994), complications from a fall.
Adelina Santos Rodriguez, 101, Filipino politician, mayor of Quezon City (1976–1986).
Koichi Sugiyama, 90, Japanese composer, conductor, and orchestrator (Dragon Quest), septic shock.
Thora Whitehead, 85, Chilean-born Australian malacologist.

References

2021-09
09